Isaac Shaw is an English professional rugby league footballer who last played as a  for Wakefield Trinity in the Betfred Super League.

He has spent time on loan from Wakefield at the Sheffield Eagles in the Betfred Championship.

In February 2022 Shaw made his Trinity Super League début against the Catalans Dragons.

References

External links
Wakefield Trinity profile
SL profile

2002 births
Living people
English rugby league players
Rugby league props
Sheffield Eagles players
Wakefield Trinity players